Aminshahr (formerly, Hoseynabad (Persian: حسين آباد), also romanized as Ḩoseynābād and Husainābād; also known as Ḩoseynābād Amīn) is a city in Anar County, Kerman Province, Iran.  At the 2006 census, its population was 4,044, in 989 families.

References

Populated places in Anar County

Cities in Kerman Province